The 1956 United States Senate election in Washington was held on November 6, 1956. Incumbent Democratic U.S. Senator Warren Magnuson won a third term in office, defeating Republican nominee Arthur B. Langlie.

Blanket primary
The blanket primary was held on September 18, 1956.

Candidates

Democratic
Warren G. Magnuson, incumbent United States Senator

Republican
Arthur B. Langlie, governor of Washington

Results

General election

Candidates
 Warren Magnuson, Democratic, incumbent U.S. Senator
 Arthur B. Langlie, Republican, governor of Washington

Results

See also 
 1956 United States Senate elections

References

Bibliography
 
 

1956
United States Senate
Washington